The Liberty of the Rolls was a liberty, and civil parish, in the metropolitan area of London, England.

The Liberty was probably created in the late medieval period by its removal from the Farringdon Without Ward of City of London, and consisted of the part of the ancient parish of St Dunstan-in-the-West that was in the Ossulstone hundred of Middlesex, the rest of the parish was within the City.

It became a separate civil parish in 1866.

Named perhaps after the ancient Rolls House upon Chancery Lane where the rolls of the Court of Chancery of England were kept, or perhaps, like other parishes, the chapel. The site of the house and chapel became the nucleus of the Public Record Office, now the Maugham Library and Provost's Lodgings  of King's College London.

It was grouped into the Strand District in 1855 when it came within the area of responsibility of the Metropolitan Board of Works.

It was a civil parish from 1866, which became part of the County of London in 1889 and in 1900 part of the Metropolitan Borough of Westminster. It was abolished as a civil parish in 1922. However, its boundary could be readily seen as that area of Westminster which was the conjunction between the City of London and the Metropolitan Borough of Holborn (and later the London Borough of Camden). This apparent territorial anomaly disappeared in 1994 when the Local Government Commission for England altered the border to place all of the area east of Chancery Lane into the City.

See also
Master of the Rolls

References

External links
'Book 5, Ch. 2: The suburbs of the City', A New History of London: Including Westminster and Southwark (1773), pp. 747-68. Date accessed: 7 June 2007.
'London, past and present; its history, associations, and traditions, by Henry B. Wheatley, F.S.A. Based upon the Handbook of London, by the late Peter Cunningham.' (1891) as quoted in White, David E. "Joseph Butler: Places Associated". Date accessed: 7 June 2007.

History of the City of Westminster
Liberties of London
Parishes united into districts (Metropolis)
Former civil parishes in London